The Bedford River Festival is a free festival held biennially in Bedford, England on the banks of the River Great Ouse.

History

Bedford River Festival was founded in 1978 to celebrate the completion of a navigable route, by water, between Bedford and The Wash.  Originally it was held annually during the late May bank holiday but for many years has been biennial and held over either the second or third weekend in July.

The festival attracts an estimated 250,000 people over the weekend, and boat owners from across the country. It is believed to be the second largest free outdoor event in the United Kingdom, after the Notting Hill Carnival.

Music across the five stages includes local bands and artists, singing groups, with headliners including the Dub Pistols,  and DJs such as DJ Spoony, Fabio and Danny Rampling.

Following redevelopment of part of the riverside, the 2018 festival expanded into neighbouring St Mary's Gardens, site of a previous council-run free music festival named Lazy Sunday.

The 2020 festival was cancelled due to the COVID-19 pandemic. The event successfully returned in July 2022 with the next Bedford River Festival scheduled to take place in July 2024.

Current festival

The festival has grown significantly in recent years, with:

 Five stages - including the main stage, two community stages, an acoustic stage, and dance music stage
 Boat shows/parades of narrowboats and yachts
 A parade with floats of local organisations and businesses
 Races - including raft races, Dragon boat races, canoeing
 Community field - for local charities and organisations
 A sports village
 Street food area
 An arts and crafts area
 A travelling funfair area
 A firework display

Image gallery

References

External links
 Official website

Bedford
Festivals in Bedfordshire
Recurring events established in 1978
1978 establishments in England
Raft races